Maya Azucena is an American singer-songwriter and cultural ambassador from Brooklyn, New York City. She is a multiple Award-winning Singer, Recording Artist and Humanitarian, known for her versatile voice which adapts to multiple genres and sports a soulful 4-octave range. She is also a cultural ambassador with a focus on Women’s & Youth Empowerment and Domestic/Sexual Violence, Azucena has completed 12+ humanitarian tours sponsored by American Embassies and U.S. State Department to countries such as China, Tanzania, Suriname, India, Sri Lanka, Haiti and Turkey. As a full-time touring Artist, she has traveled under her artist name Maya Azucena and with her band to 40+ countries.

Musical career

Solo work
Maya's first release was her 2003 album Maya Who?!. The album was independently released and was followed by American and European tours. CD BABY said of the album, "Deep and soul-bearing, she sings like she's been everywhere and seen it all. This soul/R&B/hip hop album is a fantastic launching point for a young woman with a bright and long career ahead of her."  The album featured guest artist Neal Evans of Soulive. Maya Who?! reached number 15 on CMJ's 2003 New Music Report.
Her 2007 single, "Make It Happen," combined various styles into a track that peaked at No. 3 on Billboard's Hot Club Dance Chart.  The track was released on a CD by Kult Records that featured several remixes.
Maya's second major release was her 2007 album Junkyard Jewel on Purpose Music Group Records. The album is an all-acoustic performance of vocals, guitar, percussion. The album also featured cello and violin on certain tracks. The song "Set You Free" was used in a Ford Motors Podcast.  The song "Down, Down" was used in an episode of HBO's The Wire.  The album was nominated for the Best Female Vocalist of the Year and Album of the Year at the SoulTracks Reader's Choice Awards.
In 2008, Taste This, a mix CD made by AMORE was released into circulation. The CD featured Rich Medina, Stephen Marley, Buckshot, among others.
In 2009, she released a music video for her song "Get It Together", directed by Seth Kushner. The song was inspired by the work of Martin Luther King Jr.

Collaborations
Maya sang a duet with Stephen Marley on his 2007 record Mind Control. The album won a Grammy Award for Best Reggae Album in 2008.

Maya developed a musical relationship with Croatian singer Gibonni. She sang on his 2006 album Unca Fibre, which garnered two Croatian Grammy Awards (aka 'Porin'). Aside from appearing on two of his records, including aforementioned album and Acoustic/Electric, Maya has joined him in extensive touring and television appearances throughout Europe. She has also collaborated with the album On je moj Bog, by Croatian musical group "Emanuel" and on album Veliki umovi 21. stoljeca, by band "Bolesna braca". Maya also participated in a live concert of Oliver Dragojevic in Pula Arena 2007.

Maya sang with Peruvian American rapper Immortal Technique on the track Crimes of the Heart from the 2008 album The 3rd World.

In response to the 2010 Haiti earthquake, Maya sang with emcee Cormega on his tribute song I Made A Difference. The song also featured Redman, The Revelations, and various other artists.

She sings on the new Fitz and the Tantrums album Pickin' Up the Pieces. Maya's vocals are most prominently featured on the tracks Breakin' The Chains of Love and Winds of Change. The album has received critical acclaim and has reached No. 2 on the Billboard Heatseekers Chart.

Maya sang on the 2002 Norman Brown album Just Chillin'. The album won the 2003 Grammy Award for Best Pop Instrumental Album.

Maya also collaborated with Jonathan Peters with the song Music.

Acknowledgements
Her song Make It Happen made it to No. 3 on the Billboard Dance chart.
She was named "Best Alternative Artist" by AllHipHop.com.
She won three awards including "Best Female Vocal" in the international competition for ABC Radio Network Fame Games Effigy Awards.
She was nominated for "Best Female Vocalist of the Year" and "Album of the Year" at the Reader's Choice Soul Tracks Awards.
The Network Journal's 13th Annual List of outstanding business, leadership, and community service recognized Maya in the "Top 40 Under Forty Achievement" award.

Activism and human rights
Maya has devoted a significant amount of her career to human rights participation. In 2006, Maya sang at the "Save Darfur: Rally to Stop Genocide" on the National Mall in Washington, D.C. in solidarity with Barack Obama, Paul Rusesabagina, George Clooney, Elie Wiesel and, numerous other performers, activists, and celebrities.

Maya recently performed as a part of Marcus Miller's concert for Japanese tsunami relief. She sang alongside bassist Marcus Miller, keyboardist Robert Glasper, and rapper Q-Tip.

She wrote two songs for the IFC documentary Lockdown USA, which examines the 1972 Rockefeller Drug Laws. USA

She provided music for Emmy-Winning UN documentarian Lisa Russel's latest film Not Yet Rain, regarding the advancement of Women's health laws and reproductive rights in Ethiopia.

Maya performed two years in a row at the Susan G Komen Race for the Cure in New York City's Central Park. The race is a massive fundraiser for breast cancer research.

Maya produced Hope Night, a concert event devoted to domestic abuse awareness. The event brought together several nonprofit organizations and speakers, including Governor David Paterson.

In 2008 Maya and her band did a five-week US State Department-sponsored tour of Burma, China, Philippines and Sri Lanka as a part of The Rhythm Road/American Music Abroad Program, performing concerts and workshops while appearing in national press in an effort to create cultural exchange.

Since then, in 2009, Maya did a similar tour for cultural exchange in Honduras and El Salvador, and will be returning to Honduras for another program.

In response to tours of this nature Maya was invited to the White House to celebrate the Global Cultural Initiative.

Discography

Albums
 Maya Who?! (2003)
 What You Don't Already Have (2005)
 The Rooftop: A Live Shot (2006)
 Make It Happen (Gotta Get Up) (2007)
 Junkyard Jewel (2007)
 Taste This (2008)
 Cry Love (2011)

References

External links
 Official website

American women singer-songwriters
Living people
Year of birth missing (living people)
Musicians from Brooklyn
Singer-songwriters from New York (state)